Vivo is the third live album by Mexican singer Luis Miguel. It was filmed at the Auditorio Coca-Cola concert hall in Monterrey, Mexico, where Miguel performed from 13 to 17 April 2000, as part of the second leg of his Amarte Es Un Placer Tour. Vivo was released in a live audio CD, DVD and VHS format. Vivo is the first Spanish-language live album to be released on NTSC, PAL, and DVD formats. The audio version was produced by Miguel while David Mallet directed the video album. The audio disc was released on 3 October 2000, while the video album was released on 24 October. Miguel's renditions of "Y" and "La Bikina", which he specifically performed during the concert shows in Mexico where he was joined by Cutberto Pérez's band Mariachi 2000, made available as singles for the album.

After its release, Vivo received generally favorable reviews from critics, who praised Miguel's vocals, his live performances of his tracks, and the mariachi songs. One reviewer, however, criticized the video album's lack of subtitles, closed captions, and supplemental materials. Miguel received several accolades, including a Grammy nomination for Best Latin Pop Album and a Latin Grammy nomination for Best Male Pop Vocal Album. Commercially, the album peaked at number two on the albums chart in Spain and on the Billboard Top Latin Albums chart in the United States. It also topped the albums chart in Argentina and was certified triple Platinum and Gold in Mexico.

Background and release

In 1999, Luis Miguel released his thirteenth studio album Amarte Es un Placer. To further promote the record, he launched the Amarte Es Un Placer Tour which lasted from 1999 into 2000. As part of the second leg of his tour, Miguel presented five shows at the Auditorio Coca-Cola in Monterrey, Mexico from 13 to 17 April 2000, and drew over 50,000 spectators. Miguel was accompanied by a 13-piece band during his tour which included horns, keyboards, guitars and
three female backup singers. His hour-and-a-half show consisted mainly of pop songs and ballads from Amarte Es un Placer and his earlier career, as well as medleys of boleros from the Romance-themed albums. During his concerts in Monterrey, he was joined by Cutbert Pérez's band Mariachi 2000 and performed live covers of  "Y" and "La Bikina", which were made available as singles for Vivo.

Miguel's concerts in Monterrey were recorded for Vivo. Miguel produced the album himself while the video was directed by David Mallet. The audio disc for the album was released on 3 October 2000 while the video album was launched on VHS and DVD on 24 October. It is first the Spanish-language live album to be released on NTSC, PAL, and DVD formats. "La Bikina" was released as the lead single from the album 15 September 2000. A writer for La Opinión noted that the release day was likely meant to coincide with the Mexican Independence Day. It peaked at number two on the Billboard Hot Latin Songs in the United States. "Y" was released as the album's second single on 14 November 2000 and peaked at number eight on the Hot Latin Songs chart. The live renditions of "Quiero" and "Cómo Es Posible Que a Mi Lado" were also released as a promo single in Colombia in 2001.

Reception

After its release, Vivo received generally positive reviews from music critics. AllMusic reviewer Perry Seibert gave the video album two out of five stars and criticized its lack of subtitles, closed captions, and supplemental materials, but stated that it should not "dissuade fans of Latino music from checking out this entertaining DVD from Warner Bros". The audio version itself was rated three out of five stars by an editor of AllMusic. Billboard editor Leila Cobo complimented Miguel's vocals and praised the "truly spectacular" tracks on Vivo including "La Bikina". However Cobo felt that he was "less convincing" on "Quiero" and "Tú, Sólo Tú", which she regarded "stuck-in-the-'s 80s funk/disco nuances", due to Miguel taking it "all so seriously". Mario Tarradell of The Dallas Morning News gave the album a "B" rating complimenting the record's "crisp, clean" sound, Miguel's "melodic voice", Mariachi 2000's participation on "La Bikina" which Tarradell calls the best track on Vivo. Tarradell also lauded the live renditions of "Quiero" and "Suave" as "pleasurable". However, he opined Miguel "milked the whole Latin standards thing too long" on the Romance medleys.

The Los Angeles Daily News critic Sandra Barrera rated Vivo four out of four stars commenting while the album may be viewed as "another attempt by the record-breaking artist at glorifying himself as the king of Latin pop prima donnas", she noted that it "doesn't detract from the gorgeous body of work". She also thought all of the record's tracks "represent the best of Miguel" and noted the Romance medleys "best illustrate why Miguel is the top-selling pop singer in Latin America". Richard Torres of Newsday wrote a positive review of the record noting Miguel's vocals are "deeper and gruffer than on his studio albums" which he felt gives the uptempo songs "a deeper, funkier edge". He praised Miguel's ballads "sublime", the bolero medleys, and the mariachi songs, concluding: "Miguel's the best purveyor of love songs around, and Vivo captures the best at his best."

At the 43rd Annual Grammy Awards in 2001, Vivo received a nomination for Best Latin Pop Album, which went to MTV Unplugged (2000) by Shakira. At the 2nd Annual Latin Grammy Awards in the same year, it was nominated Best Male Pop Vocal Album which was awarded to El Alma al Aire (2000) by Alejandro Sanz. At the 13th Annual Lo Nuestro Awards in 2001, Vivo was nominated Pop Album of the Year but lost to Paulina (2000) by Paulina Rubio. It was also nominated Album of the Year at the 2001 El Premio de la Gente Ritmo Latino Music Awards which also lost to Paulina. At the 2001 Billboard Latin Music Awards, Miguel won the award for Pop Album of the Year by a Male Artist.

Commercial performance
In the United States, Vivo debuted and peaked at number two on the Billboard Top Latin Albums chart on the week of 21 October 2000 with Mi Reflejo (2000) by Christina Aguilera holding off the number one position. The album also peaked at 93 on the Billboard 200 chart and number two on the Latin Pop Albums chart. It was certified double Platinum in the Latin field in America by the Recording Industry Association of America (RIAA) for shipments of 200,000 copies and ended 2001 as the ninth best-selling Latin album of the year. In Argentina, Vivo debuted atop the albums chart and the disc was certified double Platinum by the Argentine Chamber of Phonograms and Videograms Producers for shipping 120,000 copies while the video received Platinum certification for shipments of 8,000 copies. In Spain, it peaked at number two on the albums chart and was certified triple Platinum by the Productores de Música de España for shipping 300,000 copies. In Mexico,  the record was awarded Platinum and Gold for shipping 525,000 units and the video received a Gold certification in Brazil sales of 25,000 copies.

Track listing

Charts

Weekly charts

Year-end charts

Certifications

Album

Video

See also
2000 in Latin music

References

2000 live albums
2000 video albums
Luis Miguel live albums
Luis Miguel video albums
Albums produced by Luis Miguel
Live video albums
Spanish-language live albums
Spanish-language video albums
Warner Music Latina live albums
Warner Music Latina video albums